Tremolo is a musical technique.

Tremolo may also refer to:

Music
 Tremolo (electronic effect), an electronic effect on some guitars
 The Tremeloes, a British pop group
 Tremolo (album), a 1997 album by Blue Rodeo
 Tremolo (EP), a 1991 EP by My Bloody Valentine
 Tremolo harmonica
 Tremolo arm or whammy bar, a device for shifting the bridge of a guitar to produce pitch-bending or vibrato
 Floyd Rose locking tremolo
 Ibanez RG Tremolo, a series of guitars
 Kahler Tremolo System 
 Stetsbar Guitar Tremolo

Other uses
 Tremolo (comics), a character in the Marvel Universe